The Yugoslavia Olympic football team was the men's national football team of Yugoslavia from 1918 to 1992 in the Socialist Federal Republic of Yugoslavia. After the state's dissolution in 1992, the following teams were formed:
 Bosnia and Herzegovina national under-23 football team
 Croatia national under-23 football team
 Macedonia national under-23 football team
 Slovenia national under-23 football team
 FR Yugoslavia national under-23 football team (succeeded by Serbia national under-23 football team and Montenegro national under-23 football team in 2006)

Olympic Record 
Since 1992 the Olympic roster may consist of under-23 year old players, plus three over the age players.

Mediterranean Games 

Yugoslavia national under-20 football team

See also 
 Football in Yugoslavia
 Yugoslavia national football team
 Yugoslavia national under-21 football team
 Yugoslavia national under-19 football team

References

External links
 Official Football Association of Serbia website

 
European Olympic national association football teams
Football